Kinky is the self-titled debut studio album by Mexican group Kinky. It was co-produced and mixed by Chris Allison and released on March 26, 2002 by Sonic360, licensed to Nettwerk for the US and Canada. The most popular song, "Cornman", is part of the soundtrack for the PlayStation 3 video game LittleBigPlanet.  Another one of their more popular songs, "Más", is featured in the video game SSX 3 and in the 2004 film Man on Fire. A number of songs from the album were featured in the 2007 video game Crackdown.

Track listing

References

2002 debut albums
Kinky (band) albums
Nettwerk Records albums